The Diocese of Madras is a diocese of Church of South India in Tamil Nadu state of India.The diocese is one among the 22 dioceses of Church of South India.

History
The year 1640 marks the beginning of the Diocese of Madras in the Church of South India, being the year of the founding of the city of Madras, and it was only in 1647 that a Chaplain of the merchant fleet of the East India Company came ashore to celebrate Holy Communion in a temporary chapel in the Fort St. George. With the consecration of the oldest Anglican Church on the east of the Suez Canal in 1680 in the precincts of the Fort, dedicated to St Mary the Blessed virgin, under the jurisdiction of the Bishop of London, came established presence of the non-Roman Catholic Church in Madras.

The next 150 years saw the growth of the Christian population in Madras. It became obvious that St Mary's Church in the Fort cannot serve the growing and spread-out Christian population. So in 1815 the Church of St George was built on the arterial road linking St Thomas Mount and Fort St George. On 28 October 1835 Daniel Corrie, the Archdeacon of Calcutta, was consecrated Bishop and installed in the Church of St George; it marked both the coming into being of the Diocese of Madras and the elevation of the parish Church to St George's Cathedral. In 1842, her jurisdiction was described as "Presidency of Madras; Ceylon".

About the Diocese
The Diocese of Madras consists of areas under Chennai (formerly Madras), Nellore, Chinglepet, North and South Arcot and the Tamil speaking areas of Chitoor district. It has around 80,000 members, with 120 presbyters. The diocese has 186 Pastorates and 1192 congregations.

Areas under Diocese of Madras 
The Diocese of Madras is divided into four areas.
Madras North     : 51 Pastorates and 140 congregations
Madras South     : 49 Pastorates and 99 congregations
Central          : 47 Pastorates and 592 congregations
Southern         : 39 Pastorates and 361 congregations

Bishops of the Diocese
1835–1837: Daniel Corrie
1837–1849: George Spencer
1849–1861: Thomas Dealtry
1861–1899: Frederick Gell
1899–1922: Henry Whitehead
1922–1941: Edward Waller
1941–1947: Michael Hollis
1947–1965: David Chellappa
1965–1974: Lesslie Newbigin
1974–1990: Sundar Clarke
1990–1999: Masilamani Azariah (consecrated 2 January 1990)
1999–2014: Vedanayagam Devasahayam
2016–present: George Stephen Jayaraj

Notable churches of the Diocese
St. George's Cathedral, Chennai

The cathedral was built in 1815. St. George's occupies an important place in the history of Christianity in India. The architecture of St. George's Cathedral is renowned for its tall spire, pillars, marble statues, mural tablets and memorials inside. The Cathedral is a piece of architectural grandeur resting on a tier of steps.

See also

Church of South India
 Christianity in Tamil Nadu
 Trichy-Tanjore Diocese
 Tirunelveli Diocese
 Madurai-Ramnad Diocese
 Thoothukudi-Nazareth Diocese
 Diocese of Coimbatore
 Diocese of Kanyakumari

References

External links
CSI Madras Diocese
Memoirs of the first bishop
Communion
Details of the Cathedral

Madras
Religious organizations established in the 1640s
Madras
 
1835 establishments in India
Church of India, Burma and Ceylon